Mark Plotkin is an American soccer coach who coaches the DePaul Blue Demons men's soccer program. Plotkin was previously an assistant coach for the Colgate Raiders men's soccer program.

Playing career

Youth and college 
Plotkin was a four-year starter for DePaul, where he made 77 appearances, scoring 4 goals. He earned Big East Conference All-Academic teams in his four years as a player.

Coaching career 
Plotkin immediately began his coaching career after graduating from DePaul University. In 2010, he was hired as a director of operations for the men's soccer program. He remained as the director of operations through 2012, before being promoted to assistant coach. In 2014, he joined the coaching staff for Colgate University, where he was an assistant for the 2014 through 2016 seasons. Ahead of the 2017 NCAA Division I men's soccer season, Plotkin was promoted to associate head coach, where he helped the Raiders earn their first ever Sweet 16 berth in the 2017 NCAA Division I Men's Soccer Championship.

On December 21, 2017 Plotkin was appointed as the head coach for his alma mater, DePaul.

References

External links 
 Colgate Bio
 DePaul Player Bio
 DePaul Coaching Bio

1988 births
Living people
Soccer players from Illinois
DePaul Blue Demons men's soccer players
DePaul Blue Demons men's soccer coaches
Colgate Raiders men's soccer coaches
Association football midfielders
Sportspeople from Naperville, Illinois
American soccer coaches
Association football players not categorized by nationality